Barton Turf is a village and civil parish in the English county of Norfolk. It is 20 km north-east of the city of Norwich, on the northwestern edge of Barton Broad, the second largest of the Norfolk Broads.  In primary local government the area is in the district of North Norfolk.

The villages name means 'Barley farm/settlement'. 'Turf' is a late 14th century addition, probably indicating that turf cutting was an important local industry.

The civil parish, which includes the whole of Barton Broad and the smaller village of Irstead at its southern end, has an area of 10.86 km2. In the 2001 census it had a population of 480 in 181 households, the population decreasing to 467 at the 2011 Census.

Barton Turf's St Michael and All Angels Church, Barton Turf, about a mile from the clustered village centre, has a large, ornate medieval painted rood screen such as many medieval parishes who could afford fine artisans once had, but which have rarely survived the English Reformation.

Barton Hall
Barton Hall, Barton Turf is a house owned by Sir Sidney Peel's noble wife and is a Grade II (starting category) listed building with a typical, of a former manorial farmhouse, fishpond and array of outhouses around a courtyard to the front.

It was built 1742 with two fronts later remodelled. Its walls are brick, partly plastered to appear ashlar (regular, grand stone courses). Its roofs are of plain tiles and pantiles.  A grand list of 18th-century revival classical architecture follows in its listing such as detailing its tympanum, entablature, pediment, quoins, rustication, string course by cornice and rounded window within intercolumniation.

War Memorial
Barton Turf War Memorial takes the form of a brass plaque in St. Michael's Church which holds the following names for the First World War:
 Lieutenant Thomas F. Preston (1889-1917), No. 53 Squadron, Royal Flying Corps
 Sergeant Donald Salmons (1890-1917), 13th Battalion, Royal 22nd Regiment, Canadian Army
 Boy-First Class Frederick M. Dunton (1897-1915), HMS Clan MacNaugton
 Driver Frederick A. Bailey (1892-1918), 207th Field Company, Royal Engineers
 Private Charles Yaxley (1897-1916), 2nd Battalion, Essex Regiment
 Private Thomas I. Watts (1898-1918), 10th Battalion, Royal Fusiliers
 Private Stanley Drake (1892-1918), 21st Battalion, Machine Gun Corps
 Private R. Jack Yaxley (1891-1918), 1st Regiment, Canadian Mounted Rifles
 Private Richard Allard (1892-1916), 7th Battalion, Royal Norfolk Regiment
 Private Walter Allard (1894-1916), 8th Battalion, Royal Norfolk Regiment
 Private Horace Yaxley (1881-1917), 8th Battalion, Royal Norfolk Regiment
 Private John W. Dunton (1883-1916), 2nd Battalion, Royal Sussex Regiment

And, the following for the Second World War:
 Leading-Stoker William J. Blake (1909-1943), HMS Beverley

Gallery

References

External links

 High resolution images of the Barton Turf Rood Screen
 Information from Genuki Norfolk on Barton Turf
 
 http://kepn.nottingham.ac.uk/map/place/Norfolk/Barton%20Turf

Villages in Norfolk
Civil parishes in Norfolk
North Norfolk